Nina Frisk is a Swedish comedy film from 2007, written and directed by Maria Blom. Nina Frisk is an air hostess with a dysfunctional family that she tries to help.

Actors 
Sofia Helin - Nina Frisk
Daniel Götschenhjelm - Marcus
Vilde Helmerson - William
Sven Ahlström - Linus
Gunilla Nyroos - Jill
Urban Eldh - Krister
Mia Poppe - Marika
Emilio Riccardi - Mårten
Emma Vävare - Sigrid
Johan Ehn - Gunnar
Lukas Loughran - Jens
Gunnel Fred - Marie-Louise
Mats Rudal - pilot
Anja Landgré - Marika's mother
Mikael Alsberg - Marika's dad
Inga Landgré - Marika's grandmother
Karin Örnmarker - honking lady
Jannike Grut - the pilot's wife
Daniel Sjöberg - football guy
Susanne Claesson - Nina's colleague
Tekla Granlund - Nina's colleague
Cecilia Gustafsson - Nina's colleague
Fredrik Rosman - Nina's colleague

External links
 Sonet Film – Nina Frisk
 Review

2007 films
Swedish comedy films
2007 comedy films
2000s Swedish films